Damien Tussac (born 2 January 1988) is a rugby union player for Castres Olympique in the Top 14 and the German national rugby union team. He is a French citizen but qualifies to play for Germany because of a German grandmother.

Tussac made his debut for Germany against Georgia on 7 February 2009.

He played junior rugby for La Valette-du-Var, Stade Toulousain and SC Albi before joining RC Toulonnais in 2008. In the 2009–10 season, he has made appearances for the club in league and European Challenge Cup matches, but is still part of the club's under-21 team.

He signed a contract with Toulon in effect to December 2009.

Tussac made his debut for the senior team of RC Toulonnais in 2010–11 in a 43–12 win on 23 April 2011 against USA Perpignan. He also appeared once in the Heineken Cup, against the same team and in the same month, but then in an away defeat.

For the 2012–13 season he joint Leeds Carnegie, playing in the RFU Championship.

Stats
Damien Tussac's personal statistics in club and international rugby:

Club

 As of 23 July 2012

National team

 As of 28 April 2013

References

External links
 Damien Tussac at scrum.com
  Damien Tussac at totalrugby.de
  Damien Tussac at the RC Toulon website
 Damien Tussac  at itsrugby.fr

1988 births
Living people
French rugby union players
German rugby union players
Germany international rugby union players
French people of German descent
RC Toulonnais players
Rugby union props
Sportspeople from Avignon
Stade Toulousain players
SC Albi players
Leeds Tykes players
Castres Olympique players
French expatriate sportspeople in England
Expatriate rugby union players in England
French expatriate rugby union players
US Montauban players